Weird Scenes Inside the Gold Mine is the second compilation album by American rock band the Doors (following 13) and the first following the death of singer Jim Morrison. The album was released in January 1972.

The album's title is a lyric from the song "The End." The cover was designed by Bill Hoffman, with a gatefold jacket containing band shots by Joel Brodsky and liner notes by Bruce Harris, national publicist for Elektra Records.

Charts and reissue
Weird Scenes Inside the Gold Mine reached number 55 on the Billboard 200. In 1980, it was certified gold by the RIAA.

The album was reissued for the first time in over 40 years by Rhino Records as part of Record Store Day 2014. It was issued on April 19, 2014, on special amber colored vinyl, and was subsequently issued on CD for the first time on May 19, 2014.

Track listing
All songs are written by the Doors (Jim Morrison, Ray Manzarek, Robby Krieger and John Densmore), except where noted. Details are taken from the 1972 Elektra Records album and may differ from other sources.

References

Albums produced by Paul A. Rothchild
Albums produced by Bruce Botnick
The Doors compilation albums
1972 compilation albums
Elektra Records compilation albums
Compilation albums published posthumously